Woody Lake 184D is an Indian reserve of the Peter Ballantyne Cree Nation in Saskatchewan. It is 60 miles northwest of Flin Flon, and on the southern portion of the eastern shore of Wood Lake.

References

Indian reserves in Saskatchewan
Division No. 18, Saskatchewan
Peter Ballantyne Cree Nation